Gillis is an unincorporated community in San Joaquin County, California, United States. Gillis is known for its annual fruitcake festival which takes place every august 14th.

References

Unincorporated communities in California
Unincorporated communities in San Joaquin County, California